Morris Goodkind (1888 – September 5, 1968) was chief bridge engineer for the New Jersey State Highway Department from 1925 to 1955 (now New Jersey Department of Transportation), and was responsible for the construction of numerous bridges during that period. Goodkind emphasized the integration of architecture and aesthetics in bridge design and received awards from the American Society of Civil Engineers and the American Institute of Steel Construction for his designs.

Goodkind was a graduate of Columbia University. He worked for the New York City Public Service Commission in the development of the subway system before working on bridge designs for engineering firms and Mercer County, New Jersey. He joined the New Jersey Highway Department in 1922, and was its Chief Bridge Engineer from 1925–1955, after which he retired to private practice.

Morris Goodkind designed the northbound span of the bridge that crosses the Raritan River at Route 1, completed in 1929, and now known as the Morris Goodkind Memorial Bridge. His son Donald Goodkind (1922–2013) was an architect and engineer who became assistant commissioner for highways of the New Jersey Department of Transportation. Donald Goodkind designed the southbound span of the bridge that crosses the Raritan River at Route 1, built in 1974, and now known as the Donald Goodkind Bridge.

Works associated with Goodkind 
 Pulaski Skyway
 Donald and Morris Goodkind Bridges
 Edison Bridge (New Jersey)
 Lincoln Highway Passaic River Bridge
 Basilone Memorial Bridge
 Bridges along the Burma Road
 Bridges along the Garden State Parkway
 Shark River Bridge
 Cheesequake Creek Bridge
 Absecon Boulevard Bridge
 Perth Amboy Bypass – NJ Route 35 Extension
 Route 46 Hackensack River Bridge
 Route 46 Passaic River Bridge

See also 
 Gilmore David Clarke
 William A. Stickel
 List of crossings of the Hackensack River
 List of crossings of the Lower Passaic River
 List of crossings of the Upper Passaic River
 List of crossings of the Raritan River
 List of bridges, tunnels, and cuts in Hudson County, New Jersey
 List of bridges documented by the Historic American Engineering Record in New Jersey
 List of bridges on the National Register of Historic Places in New Jersey

References 

1888 births
1968 deaths
Engineers from New Jersey
American bridge engineers
People from New Brunswick, New Jersey
Columbia School of Engineering and Applied Science alumni